Goodenia cirrifica is a species of flowering plant in the family Goodeniaceae and is endemic to northern Australia. It is an ascending, widely branched, sticky herb with short-lived, lance-shaped to egg-shaped leaves at the base, linear stem leaves, and racemes of small yellow flowers.

Description

Taxonomy and naming
Goodenia cirrifica was first formally described in 1886 by Ferdinand von Mueller in The Australasian Journal of Pharmacy from specimens collected "on the Alligator-River" by Maurice William Holtze.

Distribution and habitat
This goodenia grows in forest and woodland in the northern part of the Northern Territory.

References

cirrifica
Flora of Queensland
Flora of the Northern Territory
Plants described in 1886
Taxa named by Ferdinand von Mueller